Oberonioides is a genus of orchids native to China and Thailand. Only two species are known:

Oberonioides oberoniiflora (Seidenf.) Szlach. - Thailand
Oberonioides pusillus (Rolfe) Marg. & Szlach. - Jiangxi, Fujian, Taiwan

The genus name of Oberonioides is derived from Oberon, a king of the fairies in medieval and Renaissance literature. 

The genus was circumscribed by Dariusz Lucjan Szlachetko in Fragm. Florist. Geobot. Suppl. vol.3 on page 134 in 1995.

References

External links
IOSPE orchid photos, Malaxis microtatantha (Synonym of Oberonioides pusillus)
Nature Museum, CFH图库 photos, 照片浏览 分类系统位置： 外部资源： Oberonioides microtatantha (Tang & F.T.Wang) Szlach.  小沼兰 

Orchids of Asia
Malaxideae genera
Malaxidinae